"Jolene" is a song written and recorded by American country music artist Dolly Parton. It was produced by Bob Ferguson and recorded at RCA Studio B in Nashville, Tennessee, on May 22, 1973. It was released on October 15, 1973, by RCA Victor, as the first single and title track from her album of the same name.

The song was ranked No. 217 on Rolling Stone magazine's list of "the 500 Greatest Songs of All Time" in 2004 and No. 63 on their revised list in 2021. According to Parton, it is her most-covered song.

Background
According to Parton, the song was inspired by a red-headed bank clerk who flirted with her husband, Carl Dean, at his local bank branch around the time they were newly married. In an interview, she also revealed that Jolene's name and appearance are based on that of a young fan who came on stage for her autograph.

The thumb-picked guitar on the recording is by Chip Young.

During an interview on The Bobby Bones Show in 2018, Dolly Parton revealed that she wrote "Jolene" on the same day that she wrote "I Will Always Love You".

Content
The song tells of the narrator confronting Jolene, a stunningly beautiful woman, who she worries will steal away her lover/husband. Throughout the song, the narrator implores Jolene "please don't take him just because you can." The song is unclear about whether or not Jolene intends to steal the narrator's lover, an ambiguity that has been addressed in several answer songs. Onstage in 1988, Parton told the audience that "Jolene" was a true story and the reason she did not like to sing it too often.

In 2019, the podcast Dolly Parton's America had an episode addressing the question of whether the narrator's focus on Jolene's beauty and desirability is indicative of her own attraction to Jolene. A musicologist wrote and performed a fourth verse which makes this interpretation explicit; when the podcast's hosts played audio of this performance for Parton, she responded that this was "another take on it".

Release
The song became Parton's second solo number-one single on the country charts after being released as a single in October 1973 (prior to the album's release). It reached the top position in February 1974; it was also a moderate pop hit for her and a minor adult contemporary chart entry.  , the song had sold 935,000 digital copies in the US since it became available for digital download.

The song was released as a single later in the UK, and became Parton's first top ten hit song in the country, reaching number seven in the UK Singles Chart in 1976. The song also re-entered the chart when Parton performed at the Glastonbury festival in 2014. The song has sold 255,300 digital copies in the UK as of January 2017.

Legacy 
The song was ranked No. 217 on Rolling Stone magazine's list of "the 500 Greatest Songs of All Time" in 2004, and No. 63 on their revised list in 2021. According to Parton, "Jolene" is her most frequently covered song.

"Jolene" was nominated for the Grammy Awards for Best Female Country Vocal Performance twice, in 1975 and 1976. The first nomination was for the original recording, and the second was for a live recording from the TV series In Concert. It did not win either time, but in 2017, a cover by the a cappella group Pentatonix which featured Parton as a guest singer won the Grammy Award for Best Country Duo/Group Performance.

In the film The Intervention (Clea Duvall; 2016), Annie (Melanie Lynskey) tells Lola (Alia Shawkat), "Nobody likes a Jolene," after the younger woman stirs up trouble among a group of older couples by making a play for several individuals among them.

The song's international popularity became apparent during the COVID-19 pandemic when the New Zealand government put the country in lockdown. A newspaper summary of "essential things to know" explained that washing one's hands with soap should take "as long as it takes to sing the Happy Birthday song twice or the chorus of Dolly Parton's hit song Jolene."

Charts and certifications

Weekly charts

Year-end charts

Certifications

Olivia Newton-John version

In 1976, Olivia Newton-John recorded a version and released it as the second and final single from her seventh studio album, Come On Over, in selected countries. In Japan, the song peaked at number 11 on the Oricon Singles Chart.

The single was released in Australia in early 1978, peaking at number 29.

During the COVID-19 pandemic, Newton-John created an in-studio duet with Parton, with the performance captured on video. The duet is expected to be released as part of Newton-John's first posthumous album, Just The Two Of Us: The Duets Collection.

Track listing
 "Jolene" – 3:03
 "Wrap Me in Your Arms" – 3:05

Charts

Weekly charts

Year-end charts

The White Stripes version

"Jolene (Live Under Blackpool Lights)" was released as a live single by American garage rock band the White Stripes on November 15, 2004. The single reached No. 16 on the UK Singles Chart and also reached No. 12 in Norway and No. 28 in Flanders. The White Stripes previously released a studio version of "Jolene", as the B-side to their 2000 single of "Hello Operator", from the album De Stijl. In Australia, the song was ranked No. 10 on Triple J's Hottest 100 of 2004. Another live performance of the song is featured on the 2010 live album Under Great White Northern Lights. The White Stripes' version was voted one of the greatest live covers by readers of Rolling Stone magazine.

Track listing
 "Jolene (Live Under Blackpool Lights)"
 "Black Math (Live Under Blackpool Lights)" 
 "Do (Live Under Blackpool Lights)"

Charts

Pentatonix version

In September 2016, the American a cappella group Pentatonix released a cover of the song with Dolly Parton herself as feature artist. The cover won the Grammy Award for Best Country Duo/Group Performance.

Charts

Other cover versions
Scottish new wave duo Strawberry Switchblade released their version in 1985 which peaked at No. 53 on the UK Singles Chart.
The first cover in Spanish was released in 1986 by Dominican merengue band Las Chicas del Can, titled "Youlin" and sung by Miriam Cruz.
Sherrié Austin's version of "Jolene" is the second track on her 2001 album Followin' a Feelin'. It was released as a single, and peaked at #55 on the Billboard Hot Country Songs chart in April 2001.
Mindy Smith covered "Jolene" in 2003, both for her debut album One Moment More and the Dolly Parton tribute album Just Because I'm a Woman. Parton described this cover as her favorite version of the song.
Between the years of 2010-2019, Miley Cyrus has covered the song numerous of times, including a duet with Dolly Parton herself in 2010. In 2017, Miley Cyrus and Jimmy Fallon (tambourine, backup vocals) performed a cover in disguise in the NYC Subway's Rockefeller Center station.
In 2012, Grace Potter and the Nocturnals performed a notably slowed-down version of the song. 
In 2019, Nicole Zuraitis and the Dan Pugach Nonet performed a jazz version, which was nominated for a Best Arrangement, Instruments and Vocals Grammy award that year.
In 2020, Chiquis and Becky G released a cumbia style Spanish-language cover of the song.
In 2021, Lil Nas X covered the song in the BBC Radio 1's Live Lounge, alongside cuts from his debut album Montero.

Answer songs 
Kirsty MacColl's 1995 song "Caroline" was inspired by "Jolene" and is told from the other woman's point of view.

In 2013, country singer Jennifer Nettles recorded "That Girl", which she stated in interviews is a lyrical counterpoint to "Jolene". The song is written from the perspective of the Jolene character, who Nettle feels is unfairly maligned in the original song. In this version, the other woman is shown to have no interest in taking another woman's man, and her song is in fact framed as a warning to Parton's character that "her man" has a roving eye.

In 2017, American singer-songwriter Cam released her single "Diane" in response to Parton's song. The song is sung from Jolene's point of view, where she sings to 'Diane', Parton's character, and states that she did not know that 'her man' was her man. Cam noted to Rolling Stone Country that the song is her "response to Dolly Parton's 'Jolene.' It's the apology so many spouses deserve, but never get. The other woman is coming forward to break the news to the wife about an affair, respecting her enough to have that hard conversation, once she realized he was married. Because everyone should be able to decide their own path in life, based on the truth. Women especially should do this for each other, since our self-worth can still be so wrapped up in our partners. And in true country fashion, I've set the whole raw story to upbeat music, so you can dance while you process it all."

During the 2020 COVID-19 pandemic, linguist Gretchen McCulloch wrote a parody of the song entitled "Vaccine", inspired by Parton's $1 million donation funding research on a coronavirus vaccine. The parody was sung by English professor Ryan Cordell, and the video went viral. Dolly Parton broke into parody herself, singing "Vaccine, vaccine, vaccine, vaccine, I'm begging of you please don't hesitate" as she got a 'dose of her own medicine' in a March 2021 vaccination.

Chapel Hart released an answer song in 2021 titled "You Can Have Him Jolene".

See also
Jolene (2008 film)

References

External links
Jolene lyrics at Dolly Parton On-Line
NPR: Dolly Parton's 'Jolene' Still Haunts Singers

1973 songs
1973 singles
2004 singles
Dolly Parton songs
Jill Johnson songs
The White Stripes songs
Sherrié Austin songs
Oricon International Singles Chart number-one singles
UK Independent Singles Chart number-one singles
Music videos directed by Trey Fanjoy
Olivia Newton-John songs
EMI Records singles
Strawberry Switchblade songs
XL Recordings singles
Pentatonix songs
Paula Cole songs
Songs written by Dolly Parton
RCA Records singles
RCA Victor singles
Arista Records singles
Music videos directed by Peter Zavadil
Song recordings produced by Bob Ferguson (musician)
Dami Im songs
Songs about infidelity
Miley Cyrus songs